East Krok is an unincorporated community in the town of West Kewaunee in Kewaunee County, Wisconsin, United States. Unincorporated Krok is located just west of East Krok and can be accessed via Krok Road.

References

Unincorporated communities in Wisconsin
Unincorporated communities in Kewaunee County, Wisconsin